The 2019 Cork Premier Intermediate Football Championship was the 14th staging of the Cork Premier Intermediate Football Championship since its establishment by the Cork County Board in 2006. The draw for the opening round fixtures took place 15 January 2019. The championship began on 6 April 2019 and ended on 27 October 2019.

On 27 October 2019, Éire Óg won the championship following a 0-14 to 0-12 defeat of St Michael's in the final at Páirc Uí Rinn. It was their first championship title in the grade.

Éire Óg's Daniel Goulding was the championship's top scorer.

Team changes

To Championship

Promoted from the Cork Intermediate Football Championship
 Cill na Martra

Relegated from the Cork Senior Football Championship
 Aghada

From Championship

Promoted to the Cork Senior Football Championship
 Fermoy

Results

Preliminary round

Round 1

Round 2

Round 3

Round 4

Quarter-finals

Semi-finals

Finals

Championship statistics

Miscellaneous
 St Michael's became the second team after Clyda Rovers to lose three successive finals. It was also their fifth final defeat in eight championship seasons.

References

External link

2019 Cork PIFC results 

Cork Premier Intermediate Football Championship